General Cameron may refer to:

Alexander Cameron (British Army officer, born 1781) (1781–1850), British Army general
Alexander Maurice Cameron (1898–1986), British Army lieutenant general
Sir Alan Cameron of Erracht (1753–1828), British Army lieutenant general
Archibald Cameron (British Army officer) (1870-1944), British general
Duncan Cameron (British Army officer) (1808-1888), British general
George H. Cameron (1861–1944), U.S. Army major general
John Cameron (1817–1878) (1817–1878), British Army lieutenant general
Neville Cameron (1873–1955), British Army major general
Robert Alexander Cameron (1828–1894), Union Army brigadier general and brevet major general
William Gordon Cameron (1827–1913), British Army general